Aneirin , Aneurin or Neirin was an early Medieval Brythonic war poet who lived during the 6th century. He is believed to have been a bard or court poet in one of the Cumbric kingdoms of the Hen Ogledd, probably that of Gododdin at Edinburgh, in modern Scotland. From the 17th century, he was usually known as Aneurin.

Life
Some records indicate that Aneirin was the son of Caunus (or Caw) and brother to Gildas. According to this version of his life, he was born at Dumbarton on the River Clyde. However, some scholars debate this parentage, and contend that these records are of later invention and are erroneous. Whoever his father was, Aneirin's mother, Dwywei is mentioned in Y Gododdin. She may be the same lady who, according to Old Welsh pedigrees, married King Dunod who is generally thought to have ruled in the West Riding of Yorkshire. He may also be kin to another Brythonic poet, Cian Gwenith Gwawd.

Aneirin's patrons were the noble Urien and his son, Owain. Owain was slain at the Battle of Catraeth, in which Brythonic warriors of Gododdin went up against the Angles of Deira and Bernicia. Nearly all of the Brythonic warriors were slain and their lands were absorbed into the Anglo-Saxon kingdoms. Aneirin wrote Y Gododdin after this battle, in remembrance of his fallen patrons and lords, in which he hints that he is likely the sole survivor.

After the fall of Owain, he is said to have been murdered at the hands of an unnamed Cymric lord, whom the poet had offended by reproaching him in his poem Y Gododdin for not coming to the aid of Owain.

Reputation
The Welsh Triads describe Aneirin as "prince of bards" and "of flowing verse". Nennius praises him amongst the earliest Welsh poets or Cynfeirdd, a contemporary of Talhaearn, Taliesin, Bluchbardd and Cian. References to Aneirin are found in the work of the Poets of the Princes (Beirdd y Tywysogion), but his fame declined in the later Middle Ages until the re-assertion of Welsh identity by antiquarian writers of the Tudor period. Today, the reputation of his poetry remains high, though the exact identity of the author is more controversial.

Poetry
The works attributed to Aneirin are preserved in a late-13th-century manuscript known as the Book of Aneirin (or Llyfr Aneirin). The language has been partially modernized into Middle Welsh, but other portions in Old Welsh indicate that at least some of the poetry dates from around Aneirin's time, and its attribution, therefore, may well be genuine. The work would have survived through oral transmission until first written down, perhaps in the 9th century.

Aneirin's best known work is Y Gododdin, a series of elegies for the warriors of the northern Brittonic kingdom of Gododdin who, in about 600, fell against the Angles of Deira and Bernicia at the Battle of Catraeth (probably Catterick, North Yorkshire). The poetry abounds in textual difficulties and consequently interpretations vary. One stanza contains what may possibly be the earliest reference to King Arthur, as a paragon of bravery with whom one fallen warrior is compared – the identification is, however, conjectural. The poem tells us that Aneirin was present at this battle and, having been taken prisoner, was one of only two or four Brittonic survivors; he remained a captive until his ransom was paid by Ceneu ap Llywarch Hen.

Notes

References

External links

Celtic literature Collective: The Book of Aneurin, text and translations
Gathering the Jewels: Llyfr Aneirin, includes full colour images of the entire manuscript

6th-century  Welsh poets
Welsh-language poets
Arthurian legend
Britons of the North
6th-century writers
6th-century Scottish people
Scottish poets
Sub-Roman writers